Héctor Fáver (born 9 September 1960) is an Argentine film producer and director. His film Memory of Water was screened in the Un Certain Regard section at the 1992 Cannes Film Festival.

Selected filmography
 Memory of Water (1994)

References

External links

1960 births
Living people
Argentine film producers
Argentine film directors
Argentine screenwriters
Male screenwriters
Argentine male writers
People from Buenos Aires